Lower Sorbian is a West Slavic minority language spoken in eastern Germany in the historical province of Lower Lusatia, today part of Brandenburg.

Standard Lower Sorbian is one of the two literary Sorbian languages, the other being the more widely spoken  Upper Sorbian. The Lower Sorbian literary standard was developed in the 18th century, based on a southern form of the Cottbus dialect. The standard variety of Lower Sorbian has received structural influence from Upper Sorbian.

Lower Sorbian is spoken in and around the city of Cottbus in Brandenburg. Signs in this region are typically bilingual, and Cottbus has a Lower Sorbian Gymnasium where one language of instruction is Lower Sorbian. It is a heavily endangered language. Most native speakers today belong to the older generations.

Phonology

The phonology of Lower Sorbian has been greatly influenced by contact with German, especially in Cottbus and larger towns. For example, German-influenced pronunciation tends to have a voiced uvular fricative  instead of the alveolar trill . In villages and rural areas, German influence is less marked, and the pronunciation is more "typically Slavic".

Consonants

  are bilabial, whereas  are labiodental.
  are alveolar , whereas  are dental .
Their actual phonetic realization is flat postalveolar  in all of the Lower Sorbian-speaking area. This is unlike in standard Upper Sorbian, where these are palato-alveolar .
  is voiceless , unlike Upper Sorbian, where it is voiced .

Final devoicing and assimilation
Lower Sorbian has both final devoicing and regressive voicing assimilation: 
dub  "oak" is pronounced 
susedka  "(female) neighbor" is pronounced 
licba  "number" is pronounced 

The hard postalveolar fricative  is assimilated to  before :
šćit  "protection" is pronounced

Vowels
The vowel inventory of Lower Sorbian is exactly the same as that of Upper Sorbian. It is also very similar to the vowel inventory of Slovene.

  is retracted to  after hard consonants.
 The  and  distinctions are weakened or lost in unstressed syllables.
  is phonetically central .

Stress
Stress in Lower Sorbian normally falls on the first syllable of the word:

 Łužyca  "Lusatia"
 pśijaśel  "friend"
 Chóśebuz  "Cottbus"

In loanwords, stress may fall on any of the last three syllables:

 internat  "boarding school"
 kontrola  "control"
 september  "September"
 policija  "police"
 organizacija  "organization"

Most one-syllable prepositions attract the stress to themselves when they precede a noun or pronoun of one or two syllables:

 na dwórje  "on the courtyard"
 pśi mnjo  "near me"

However, nouns of three or more syllables retain their stress:

 pśed wucabnikom  "in front of the teacher"
 na drogowanju  "on a journey"

Orthography
The Sorbian alphabet is based on the Latin script but uses diacritics such as the acute accent and caron.

Sample
Article 1 of the Universal Declaration of Human Rights in Lower Sorbian:

(All people are born free and equal in their dignity and rights. They are given reason and conscience and they shall create their relationships to one another according to the spirit of brotherhood.)

See also
 Upper Sorbian language

References

Bibliography

External links

 Online course for Lower and Upper Sorbian (English, Sorbian, German)
 Dolnoserbski radio program (RealAudio) 
 Lower Sorbian Vocabulary List (from the World Loanword Database)
 Lower Sorbian DoReCo corpus compiled by Hauke Bartels and Marcin Szczepański. Audio recordings of narrative texts, with transcriptions time-aligned at the phone level and translations.

Dictionaries

Czech-Lower Sorbian and Lower Sorbian-Czech
 Slovník DolnoLužická Srbština <=> Čeština

German–Lower Sorbian
 Deutsch-Niedersorbisches Wörterbuch at dolnoserbski.de 
 Korpus GENIE – GEsprochenes NIEdersorbisch/Wendisch

Lower Sorbian–German 
 Dolnoserbsko-nimske słowniki at dolnoserbski.de] 
 Lexikalische Übungen und Terminologie at the Universität Leipzig  

 
Endangered Slavic languages
Sorbian, Lower
Sorbian languages
Sorbian, Lower
Slavic languages written in Latin script